Paul Velsa (29 December 1905 – 20 May 1944) was a French film actor. He appeared in more than thirty films between 1928 and 1938.

Selected filmography
 Captain Fracasse (1929)
 Heart of Paris (1932)
 Mademoiselle Josette, My Woman (1933)
 The Crisis is Over (1934)
 Nitchevo (1936)
 The Brighton Twins (1936)

References

Bibliography
 Alpi, Deborah Lazaroff. Robert Siodmak: A Biography, with Critical Analyses of His Films Noirs and a Filmography of All His Works. McFarland, 1998.

External links

Year of birth unknown
Year of death unknown
French male film actors
French male silent film actors
20th-century French male actors